The NRG Arena (formerly the Astroarena and Reliant Arena), is a 350,000 square feet (33,000 m²) sports center in NRG Park, in Houston, Texas, USA.

Building format
The main partition on the first floor is the "Arena Proper", a 24,000 gross square foot arena that seats up to 8,500 people.

In addition to the Arena Proper, there are four exhibit halls within the NRG Arena. The largest hall is Exhibit Hall D, boasting  of space. The second is Exhibit Hall A, which has  of space. Exhibit Halls B and C each have  of floor space as well.

The upper level maintains smaller meeting rooms and office space as well as the "Stockman's Club".

History

Construction of the Astroarena was completed in 1974 adjacent to the Astrohall. Although the Astrohall (renamed Reliant Hall temporarily) was demolished in May 2002 to make way for a parking lot when NRG Stadium was being completed. Astroarena was renamed to Reliant Arena in 2000 when Reliant Energy bought the sponsorship of the facility.

The Arena has since been utilized for several other events, including the National Catholic Youth Conference in 2003 and the peripheral events of the Houston Livestock Show and Rodeo.

After previously occupying the Compaq Center from 1998 to 2000, the PBR held a Bud Light Cup event in Reliant Arena in 2001; this was their last big-league event in Houston to date.

In 1993, World Championship Wrestling held their Fall Brawl. Furthermore, the WWE hosted the March 31, 2005 episode of Smackdown.

In 2005, the Arena was used as auxiliary housing and a field clinic for residents displaced by Hurricane Katrina after it was deemed that the Reliant Astrodome would be insufficient for comfortably housing over 30,000 residents.

On July 16, 2007 the arena played host to the first indoor stop on the 2007 Vans Warped Tour.

On July 13, 2008, the arena hosted Total Nonstop Action Wrestling's Victory Road event.

Reliant Arena became the home of the Women's National Basketball Association's Houston Comets for what proved to be their final season, 2008.

On March 12, 2014, the arena was renamed as the NRG Arena, after the sponsor, Reliant Energy, had been acquired and absorbed into NRG Energy.

References

External links

 Arena details and floorplans
 More Reliant Arena details and floorplans

1974 establishments in Texas
Basketball venues in Houston
Houston Comets venues
Indoor arenas in Texas
Music venues in Houston